Trompf is a surname. Notable people with the surname include: 

Keirra Trompf (born 1985), Australian netball player
Percy Trompf (1902–1964), Australian commercial artist

See also
Tromp (surname)